
Year 310 BC was a year of the pre-Julian Roman calendar. At the time, it was known as the Year of the Consulship of Rullianus and Censorinus (or, less frequently, year 444 Ab urbe condita). The denomination 310 BC for this year has been used since the early medieval period, when the Anno Domini calendar era became the prevalent method in Europe for naming years.

Events 
 By place 
 Macedonia 
 Ptolemy (general) forms an alliance with Cassander revolting against Antigonus

 Cyprus 
 By order of Ptolemy, Nicocles (Paphos) kills himself

 Seleucid Empire 
 Antigonus orders Nicanor, one of his generals, to invade Babylonia from the east and his son Demetrius Poliorcetes to attack it from the west. Nicanor assembles a large force but it is surprised and defeated by Seleucus at the river Tigris, and his troops are either cut to pieces or defect to the enemy. Similarly, Demetrius Poliorcetes fails to oust Seleucus.

 Asia Minor 
 Ptolemy attacks Cilicia, territory held by Antigonus.
 The cities of Antigonia Troas (later known as Alexandria Troas) and Antigoneia (later known as Nicaea) are founded by Antigonus I Monophthalmus.

 Sicily and Africa 
 The tyrant of Syracuse, Agathocles, escapes from the siege of the city by the Carthaginians with a fleet and carries the war with the Carthaginians back into his enemy's territory. He defeats the Carthaginians in the Battle of White Tunis.

 Roman Republic 
 Rome deals with renewed trouble from the Etruscans, who are persuaded by the Samnites to cease their alliance with the Romans. In the Battle of Lake Vadimo, the Romans under Fabius Maximus Rullianus defeat the Etruscans.

 Illyria 
 The Autariatae disappear due to Celtic migrations.

Births 
 Aristarchus of Samos, Greek astronomer and mathematician (approximate date) (d. c. 230 BC)
 Huiwen of Zhao, Chinese king of Zhao (Warring States Period) (d. 266 BC)
 Xun Zi, Chinese philosopher (approximate date) (d. c. 230 BC)

Deaths 
Pytheas, Greek merchant, geographer and explorer from the Greek colony Massilia (today Marseille) (b. c. 380 BC)
Nicocles (Paphos) king of Paphos

References